Frere is a surname. Notable people with the surname include:

Alexander Stuart Frere (1892–1984), English publisher
Bartholomew Frere (1776–1851), English diplomat
Henry Frere (1830–1881), English cricketer
Sir Henry Bartle Frere (1815–1884), British colonial administrator
James Frere (1920–1994), Chester Herald at the College of Arms in London
James Hatley Frere (1779–1866), English writer on prophecy
John Frere (1740–1807), English antiquary
John Hookham Frere (1769–1846), English diplomat, author and poet
Mary Frere (1845–1911), English writer
Sheppard Frere (1916–2015), British historian and archaeologist
Tobias Frere-Jones (born 1970), American typeface designer and design educator
Toby Frere (1938–2020), Royal Navy vice-admiral
Walter Frere (1863–1938), British Anglican bishop
William Frere (1775–1836), English lawyer and academic

See also 
Frère
Friar
Fryar
Freer (disambiguation)
Fryer (surname)
Frier